The Minister of Tourism, Arts and Culture has been Tiong King Sing since 3 December 2022. The minister is supported by Deputy Minister of Tourism. The minister administers the portfolio through the Ministry of Tourism, Arts, and Culture.

List of ministers of tourism
The following individuals have been appointed as Minister of Tourism, or any of its precedent titles:

Political Party:

List of ministers of arts
The following individuals have been appointed as Minister of Arts, or any of its precedent titles:

Political Party:

List of ministers of culture
The following individuals have been appointed as Minister of Culture, or any of its precedent titles:

Political Party:

List of ministers of heritage
The following individuals have been appointed as Minister of Heritage, or any of its precedent titles:

Political Party:

References

Ministry of Tourism, Arts and Culture (Malaysia)
Lists of government ministers of Malaysia
Tourism ministers
Culture ministers